Metlavaripalem is a small village in the Prakasam district of the Indian state of Andhra Pradesh. It is the village in Pedairlapadu panchayat in Kandukur revenue division.

Villages in Prakasam district